Arcane may refer to:

Books and comics
 Anton Arcane, a DC Comics character
 Arcane Jill Watson, a character in The Hitchhiker's Guide to the Galaxy
 Arcane literature, such as in Cthulhu Mythos

Gaming
 Arcane magic (Dungeons & Dragons), in the Dungeons & Dragons role-playing game
 Complete Arcane, a supplement rulebook for the above game
 Arcane Archer, character classes in the above game
 Arcane Trickster, character classes in the above game
 Arcane Online, a mobile game released in 2016

Music
 Arcane (album), the debut studio album led by drummer Cindy Blackman
 "The Arcane", a song by Dead Can Dance from the album Dead Can Dance

Other uses
Arcane, a 1990s magazine published by Future plc
Arcane (TV series), a 2021 animated series by Riot Games, set in the League of Legends universe

See also
 Arcan (disambiguation)
 Arcana (disambiguation)